Morgan Center is an unincorporated community in Morgan Township, Knox County, Ohio.

History
The name was historically also rendered as Morgan Centre. A post office called Morgan Centre was established in 1890, the name was changed to Morgan Center in 1893, and the post office closed in 1901.

References

Unincorporated communities in Knox County, Ohio
1890 establishments in Ohio
Populated places established in 1890
Unincorporated communities in Ohio